Chira Irina Apostol (later Stoean, born 1 June 1960) is a retired Romanian rower who competed in coxed fours. In this event she won an Olympic gold medal in 1984 and silver medals at the world championships in 1983 and 1985. She competed at the 1986 World Rowing Championships under her married name.

References

External links
 
 
 
 

1960 births
Living people
People from Ialomița County
Romanian female rowers
Rowers at the 1984 Summer Olympics
Olympic gold medalists for Romania
Olympic rowers of Romania
Olympic medalists in rowing
World Rowing Championships medalists for Romania
Medalists at the 1984 Summer Olympics
20th-century Romanian women